Zhu Ronghua (born 9 May 1974) is a Chinese long-distance runner. He competed in the men's marathon at the 2004 Summer Olympics.

References

1974 births
Living people
Athletes (track and field) at the 2004 Summer Olympics
Chinese male long-distance runners
Chinese male marathon runners
Olympic athletes of China
Place of birth missing (living people)
People from Dali
Runners from Yunnan